Martin Emmrich and Andreas Siljeström are the defending champions, but Emmrich chose not to participate and Siljeström chose to partner with Mateusz Kowalczyk. Siljeström and Kowalczyk lost in the semifinals to Ken Skupski and Neal Skupski.

Ken Skupski and Neal Skupski went on to win the title, defeating Nikola Mektić and Antonio Šančić in the final 6–3, 7–5.

Seeds

Draw

References

Main Draw

2016 ATP Challenger Tour